The General Electric GE90 is a family of high-bypass turbofan aircraft engines built by GE Aviation for the Boeing 777, with thrust ratings from . It entered service with British Airways in November 1995. It is one of three options for the 777-200, -200ER, and -300 versions, and the exclusive engine of the -200LR, -300ER, and 777F. It was the largest jet engine, until being surpassed in January 2020 by its successor, the  GE9X, which has a  larger diameter fan. The GE90, however, is still more powerful than its successor, the GE9X.

Development

The GE90 was developed from the NASA 1970s Energy Efficient Engine, a prototype variant of the General Electric CF6. GE's GE36 Un-Ducted Fan (propfan) was meant to replace the CFM International CFM56 high-bypass turbofan which was initially uncompetitive against the rival IAE V2500. However, when the V2500 ran into technical problems, sales of the CFM56 took off. GE was not interested in having the GE36 cannibalize the CFM56, and while "the UDF could be made reliable by earlier standards, turbofans were getting much, much better than that." However, GE integrated the UDF's blade technology directly into the GE90.

The GE90 engine was launched in 1990.  GE Aviation teamed with Snecma (France, 24%), IHI (Japan) and Avio (Italy) for the program.
Initially the GE90 was only one of three 777 options and GE Aviation then-CEO Brian H. Rowe would have paid for the development of putting it on an A330, but Airbus' strategy for long-haul was the four-engine A340, missing the market favouring twins.

The bigger and higher-thrust -115B version that powers the second generation 777 (-300ER, -200LR, and -200F) had its first run at the GE facility in Peebles, Ohio in November 2001.

Design

The GE90's 10-stage high-pressure compressor developed a then-industry record pressure ratio of 23:1 and is driven by a 2-stage, air-cooled, HP turbine. A 3-stage low-pressure compressor, situated directly behind the fan, supercharges the core. The fan/LPC is driven by a 6-stage low-pressure turbine.

The higher-thrust variants, GE90-110B1 and -115B, have a different architecture from that of the earlier GE90 versions. General Electric incorporated an advanced larger diameter fan made from composite materials which enhanced thrust at low flight speeds. However, GE also needed to increase core power to improve net thrust at high flight speeds. Consequently, GE elected to increase core capacity, which they achieved by removing one stage from the rear of the HP compressor and adding an additional stage to the LP compressor, which more than compensated for the reduction in HP compressor pressure ratio, resulting in a net increase in core mass flow 
. The higher-thrust GE90 variants are the first production engines to feature swept rotor blades.

Operational history
As one of the three available engines for the new Boeing 777 long-range airliner, the GE90 was an all-new $2 billion design in contrast to the offerings from Pratt & Whitney and Rolls-Royce which were modifications of existing engines.

The first General Electric-powered Boeing 777 was delivered to British Airways on November 12, 1995. The aircraft, with two GE90-77Bs, entered service five days later. Initial service was affected by gearbox bearing wear concerns, which caused the airline to temporarily withdraw its 777 fleet from transatlantic service in 1997. British Airways' aircraft returned to full service later that year.

Problems with GE90 development and testing caused delays in Federal Aviation Administration certification. In addition the GE90's increased thrust was not yet required by airlines and it was also the heaviest engine of the three available choices, making it the least popular option while the Rolls-Royce engine was the most popular. British Airways soon replaced the GE90 with Rolls-Royce engines on their 777s.

For Boeing's second-generation 777 long-range versions (later named 777-200LR, 777-300ER, and 777F), greater thrust was needed to meet the aircraft requirements. General Electric and Pratt & Whitney insisted on a winner-take-all contract due to the $500 million investment in engine modifications needed to meet the requirements. GE received sole engine supplier status for the higher-thrust engine variants for the 777-200LR, -300ER, and 777F. The improved version entered service with Air France in May 2004.

The higher thrust GE90-110B1 and -115B engines, in combination with the second-generation 777 variants -200LR and -300ER, were primary reasons for 777 sales being greater than those of the rival A330/340 series.  Using two engines produces a typical operating cost advantage of around 8–9% for the -300ER over the A340-600.  The 777-300ER was also seen as a 747-400 replacement amid rising fuel prices given its 20% fuel burn advantage.

Until passed by its derivative, the GE9X, the GE90 series held the title of the largest engines in aviation history. As a result, the GE90 engine can only be air-freighted using an outsize cargo aircraft such as the Antonov An-124, which restricts shipping options if, due to an emergency diversion, a 777 were stranded needing an engine change. If the fan and fan case are removed the engine may be shipped using a 747 Freighter.

The -94B for the -200ER was retrofitted with some of the first FAA-approved 3D-printed components.

In 2011, its list price was US$ million, and it had an in-flight shutdown rate (IFSD) of one per million engine flight-hours. Until November 2015, it accumulated more than 8 million cycles and 50 million flight hours in 20 years. 
In July 2020, the fleet of 2,800 engines surpassed 100 million hours, powering over 1,200 aircraft for 70 operators with a dispatch reliability rate of 99.97%.
A complete overhaul costs more than $12 million.

Records

The GE90-115B has enough thrust to fly the GE Boeing 747-100 flying testbed with the other three engines at idle, an attribute demonstrated during a flight test.

This thrust record was reached inadvertently as part of a one-hour, triple-red-line engine stress test using a GE90-115B development engine at GE Aviations' Peebles Test Operation, which is an outdoor test complex near Peebles, Ohio.

The initial GE90 fan shaft design loads were greatly increased for operational torque and the fan blade-off condition. To accommodate the increase in fan-shaft torsional and bending stresses, a steel alloy, GE1014, not previously used in aircraft engines was required. A significantly longer fan shaft spline-coupling was required and maintaining the required high machining accuracy was challenging.  

In October 2003, a Boeing 777-300ER broke the ETOPS record by being able to fly five and a half hours (330 minutes) with one engine shut down. The aircraft, with GE90-115B engines, flew from Seattle to Taiwan as part of the ETOPS certification program.

On November 10, 2005, the GE90 entered the Guinness World Records for a second time. The GE90-110B1 powered a 777-200LR during the world's longest flight by a commercial airliner, though there were no fare-paying passengers on the flight, only journalists and invited guests. The 777-200LR flew  in 22 hours, 22 minutes, flying from Hong Kong to London "the long way": over the Pacific, over the continental U.S., then over the Atlantic to London.

Incidents

On  August 11, 2004, a GE90-85B powering a Boeing 777-200ER on British Airways flight  2024 suffered an engine failure on takeoff from George Bush Intercontinental Airport, Houston. The pilots noticed a noise and vibration on takeoff but continued the rotation. At 1500 ft AGL they noticed smoke and haze in the cockpit and cabin crew advised cabin was filling with smoke. They returned to the airport for an immediate emergency landing.
Findings were a stage 2 turbine blade had separated at its shank damaging the trailing blades causing the vibration. The debris was contained in the engine casing.

Engine debris was found on the ground.

On September 8, 2015, a GE90-85B powering a Boeing 777-236ER on British Airways Flight 2276 suffered an uncontained failure during take-off roll at Las Vegas McCarran Airport, leading to a fire. NTSB and FAA investigations were begun to determine the cause; initial findings were reported in September 2015.

On June 27, 2016, a GE90-115B powering a Boeing 777-300ER, on Singapore Airlines Flight 368, received an engine oil warning during flight and returned to Singapore Changi Airport. On landing the malfunctioning right engine caught fire, leading to fire damage to the engine and the wing.

Transfer gearbox failures
The FAA issued an Airworthiness Directive (AD) on May 16, 2013, and sent it to owners and operators of General Electric GE90-110B1 and GE90-115B turbofan engines. This emergency AD was prompted by reports of two failures of transfer gearbox assemblies (TGBs) which resulted in in-flight shutdowns (IFSDs). Investigation revealed that the failures were caused by TGB radial gear cracking and separation. This through the combined effect of manufacturing process and operating stresses. Further inspections found two additional radial gears with cracks. This condition, if not corrected, could result in additional IFSDs of one or more engines, loss of thrust control, and damage to the airplane. The Airworthiness Directive requires compliance by taking remedial measures within five days of receipt of the AD. All affected modules have been replaced.

Specifications

Derivatives

GEnx

The GEnx engine, that has been developed for the Boeing 787 Dreamliner and 747-8, is derived from a smaller core variant of the GE90, also featuring a fan with swept rotor blades.

GP7000

GE Aviation set up a cooperative venture with Pratt & Whitney, named Engine Alliance, under which the companies have developed an engine for the Airbus A380, named GP7000, based on an 0.72 flow scale of the GE90-110B/115B core.

GE9X

In February 2012, GE announced studies on a 10% more efficient derivative, dubbed the GE9X, to power the new Boeing 777-8X/9X aircraft.

LM9000

The LM9000 is an aeroderivative gas turbine available in two options; the LM9000 without water augmentation outputting  at a 42.4% efficiency before cogeneration, and the LM9000 with water augmentation outputting  at a 42.7% efficiency before cogeneration. The engine's 33:1 pressure ratio comes from a 4-stage low pressure compressor followed by a 9 stage high pressure compressor, driven by a  2 stage high pressure turbine and a 1-stage low pressure turbine, powering a 4-stage free turbine.

See also

References

Notes

External links 

 
 

High-bypass turbofan engines
GE90
1990s turbofan engines